Lawrence Johnstone Burpee  (March 5, 1873 – October 13, 1946) was a Canadian librarian, historian and author.

Biography 
Born in Halifax, Nova Scotia, he moved to Ottawa at an early age, where from 1890 to 1905 he worked as private secretary to three federal ministers of justice. The following seven years he was librarian at the Ottawa Public Library, before becoming Canadian Secretary of the International Joint Commission in 1912, a post he occupied until his death.

Burpee helped found the Canadian Historical Association in 1922 and was its first president until 1925. He also was president of the Royal Society of Canada in 1936/37. He published many books and articles mainly related to Canadian history and geography and was the founding editor of the Canadian Geographical Journal.

Burpee was a supporter of many causes, from the need for a national library to the independence of Poland.  On the latter he published a 1939 wartime article "Poland’s fight for freedom" in the Canadian Geographical Journal. On his way to Warsaw in 1946, Burpee died at Oxford, England. He is buried there, although he is also memorialized on a stone in Beechwood Cemetery.

Selected publications
Burpee, Lawrence J. The Oxford Encyclopaedia of Canadian History; London and Toronto, Oxford University Press 1926.
 Burpee, Lawrence J. ed with introduction, notes and chronological tables: An Historical Atlas of Canada; Toronto, Thomas Nelson and Sons, Ltd 1927
 Burpee, Lawrence J. trans. Journals and Letters of Pierre Gaultier de Varennes de la Verendrye and His Sons. Toronto: Champlain Society, 1927.
 Burpee, Lawrence J. The Discovery of Canada; Toronto, The Macmillan Company of Canada Ltd, 1948
 Burpee, Lawrence J. The Discovery of Canada; Ottawa, The Graphics Publishers Ltd., 1929

References

Further reading
"Lawrence Johnston Burpee"' at The Canadian Encyclopedia. David Evans published 01/15/2008
Presidents of the Canadian Historical Association.
History of Canadian Geographic.
Kitchen, P.: The Call for a National Library, National Library News 32(5), May 2000. (With a 1909(?) image.)
A photo from 1926.
Roy-Sole, Monique: In tune with the times, Canadian Geographic, November/December 2004.

External links

 
 
 
 
 In the Lawrence Johnstone Burpee fonds at U. British Columbia, there are copies of his passports, letters to and from one of his daughters, and some unpublished works by Lawrence J. Burpee.
 The Lawrence J. Burpee Collection at the Victoria University Library at the University of Toronto
 Lawrence J. Burpee Manuscripts at Dartmouth College Library

1873 births
1946 deaths
19th-century Canadian civil servants
20th-century Canadian civil servants
Canadian librarians
Canadian non-fiction writers
Fellows of the Royal Society of Canada
Writers from Halifax, Nova Scotia
Presidents of the Canadian Historical Association